Chisocheton velutinus is a tree in the family Meliaceae. The specific epithet  is from the Latin meaning "velvety", referring to the indumentum of the leaves and fruits.

Description
The flowers are cream-coloured.

Distribution and habitat
Chisocheton velutinus is endemic to Borneo. Its habitat is rain forests from sea-level to  altitude.

References

velutinus
Endemic flora of Borneo
Trees of Borneo
Plants described in 2003